The Ardmore Open was a golf tournament on the PGA Tour from 1952 to 1954. It was played at Dornick Hills Golf & Country Club in Ardmore, Oklahoma.

Winners

See also
Ardmore Open (LPGA Tour) – a 1954 LPGA Tour event

References

Former PGA Tour events
Golf in Oklahoma
Recurring sporting events established in 1952
Recurring events disestablished in 1954
1952 establishments in Oklahoma
1954 disestablishments in Oklahoma